Das Ich is a German dark wave/gothic-industrial band formed in 1989. The group, fronted by Stefan Ackermann and Bruno Kramm, were one of the prominent founders of and contributors to "Neue Deutsche Todeskunst" (New German Death Art) a musical movement in the early 1990s. The band is known for having a classically-inspired gothic-industrial style, for their on-stage theatrics, and their almost exclusive use of German-language lyrics. The German term Das Ich makes reference to the Freudian concept James Strachey translated as "ego" ( "The I").

History
Bruno Kramm and Stefan Ackermann met in Bayreuth, Germany in 1989 at a nightclub called the "Crazy Elephant". Bruno had already been involved in several band projects, and after some hours of socializing the two decided to begin a project together.
 

In 1989, the members of Das Ich founded the Danse Macabre record label which released their first EP, Satanische Verse, and their first album, Die Propheten. Die Propheten was released in Germany in 1991 and was reissued in the US in 1997, selling over 30,000 copies. Their second album, Staub, was released in 1994 and charted in Germany for 11 weeks. The band played many live shows in Europe but made its first US tour in June 1995 and a second, longer US tour of 13 shows, in 1997.

In 1998, the album Egodram, saw the group moving towards a more rhythmic, industrial dance-oriented sound, resulting in the club singles "Kindgott" and "Destillat". The album was followed by a tour in 1998 in the US and Mexico. Later in 1998, the band released their next album, Morgue, a concept album with lyrics based on the poems of expressionist writer Gottfried Benn.

In 1999, they released a remix album, Re-Laborat, that included Das Ich songs remixed by popular electro-industrial bands including And One, Funker Vogt, Wumpscut, and VNV Nation. The album ranked #31 on the German Alternative Chart's Top 50 Albums chart for 1999, while the U.S. re-issue peaked at #7 on the CMJ RPM Charts in 2001. Bruno Kramm released his solo spin-off Coeur in 2000. 

In 2002, Das Ich released the album Antichrist, which is a critical reflection on world politics post-9-11. In 2003, the best-of album Relikt was released.

In 2004, they released the double album Lava, made of:
Lava:Glut: Disc with more instrumental than industrial tracks.
Lava:Asche: Disc with dance versions of songs from Lava:Glut.
Lava:Addendum: Bonus DVD packaged with some versions of the release.

In 2006, they released an additional dual album:
Cabaret: Disc with circus style songs, like the name implies, and more instrumental.
Varieté: Disc with versions of songs from Cabaret remixed by bands including Stillste Stund, Metallspürunde, FabrikC, etc.

In the same year, they released a new DVD, Panopticum.

After 2010, the band underwent a short hiatus due to the health problems suffered by lead singer Stefan Ackermann, but the band had a revival with their performance at the Wave-Gotik-Treffen in 2013.

In 2017, the band remastered and re-released their first EP, Satanische Verse, as a limited-edition (500 copies) vinyl with additional tracks.

In 2018, an announcement about creating new album appeared on official website, originally scheduled for release in 2017 or 2018, that has yet to be released.

In March 2023 the band announced a South American tour — the seventh of their career — beginning in Sao Paulo, Brazil.

Band members
Stefan Ackermann – lead vocals
Bruno Kramm – keyboards, synthesizers, programming, backing vocals

Live band members
Stefan Siegl (Sissy) (2006)
Kain Gabriel Simon (2000–2006, 2016)
Daniel Galda (1994–1999)
Chad Blinman (1994–1996)
Jakob Lang (1998–1999)
Michael Schmid (1999–2000)
Ringo Müller (2006)
Damian "Plague" Hrunka (2000–present)
Martin Söffker - keyboards, backing vocals (2008–present)

In film
Music by Das Ich made up the soundtrack of the movie Das Ewige Licht ("The Eternal Light"), directed and produced by Hans Helmut Häßler. The soundtrack was released as Das innere Ich in 1996.

Discography

Studio albums
1990: Satanische Verse ("Satanic Verses")
1991: Die Propheten ("The Prophets") (re-released in 2009)
1994: Staub ("Dust")
1998: Egodram
1998: Morgue
2002: Anti'christ
2004: LAVA:Glut ("LAVA:Ember")
2006: Cabaret (limited box set issued featuring remix album Varieté and DVD Panopticum)

Extended plays
2008: Kannibale

Remix albums
2000: Re-Laborat
2004: LAVA:Asche (remixes of Lava:Glut; "LAVA:Ash")

Singles
1994: "Stigma"
1998: "Kindgott" ("Child God")
1998: "Destillat"

Soundtracks
1996: Das innere Ich ("The Inner Self")

Compilations
1999: Re-Kapitulation (compilation, US only)
2003: Relikt (compilation; "Relic")
2007: Alter Ego (best-of compilation)
2007: Addendum (compilation of remixes, rare tracks and alternate versions)

Live albums
1995: Feuer ("Fire")

Video
2002: Momentum (VCD/DVD)

Side projects
1995: Die Liebe (feat. Atrocity, LP; "The Love")
2000: Coeur (CD) (solo project released as "Kramm")

References

External links

Official site since 2017
Official site
Official MySpace Profile

German dark wave musical groups
German musical duos
German electronic musicians
German gothic rock groups
Neue Deutsche Todeskunst groups
Metropolis Records artists
Massacre Records artists